Arianne Cerdeña (born March 11, 1962) is a Filipino ten-pin bowling player. She is best known for winning the first gold medal for the Philippines in the Summer Olympics; albeit in a demonstration event hence the medal won was not counted in the official medal tally. She won the medal at the 1988 Summer Olympics in Seoul, South Korea.
She is elected to the Philippine Sports Hall of Fame in March 2021.

Career
Arianne Cerdeña debuted for the Philippine national team at the 1981 Southeast Asian Games. She won six gold medals overall in the regional games, including the single medal won by the Philippine bowling delegation in the 1999 edition in Brunei.

Cerdeña won a silver medal in Trios with Bong Coo and Lita de la Rosa in the quadrennial Fédération Internationale des Quilleurs FIQ World Championship now WTBA World Tenpin Bowling Championships in 1983 held in Caracas, Venezuela.

Cerdeña is an Asian Games Gold Medalist. She was a member of the gold medal Team of 5 event  with Bong Coo, Catalina Solis, Cecilia Gaffud and Rebecca Watanabe and shared the doubles bronze medal with Bong Coo in the 1986 Asian Games in Seoul, South Korea.

Cerdeña would return to South Korea two years later to participate in the 1988 Summer Olympics where the bowling tournament is a demonstration event. Coached by Ernesto Lopa, she won the first Olympic gold medal for the Philippines outbesting Atsuko Asai of Japan. Although as a demonstration event, the medal was not counted in the official medal tally for the Games.

Cerdeña also captured two silver medals at the quadrennial World Games held at Karlsruhe, West Germany 1989, in singles and mixed doubles with Jorge Fernandez.

At the 1993 Bowling World Cup  in Johannesburg, South Africa, Arianne Cerdeña won the Brent Peterson Country Award with Paeng Nepomuceno. She placed third in the singles event.

She retired from competitive bowling, last participating in the 2001 Southeast Asian Games where she clinched her last gold medal in the doubles event with Liza del Rosario, to focus more on her family.

Personal life and post-retirement
Cerdeña is married to Raymond Valdez, a former dentistry student at the Centro Escolar University like herself with whom she has a daughter. After retiring, she settled in the United States in 2002 to join her husband who has been living in the US since 1988. Unable to find employment in the US she decided to study nursing along with her husband in Los Angeles. In 2004, she had a brief bout with ovarian cancer but she eventually recovered and became a registered nurse. As of 2021, she is working at the California Hospital Medical Center for at least five years already.

In 2021, Cerdeña was inducted to the Philippine Sports Hall of Fame.

References

Living people
Bowlers at the 1986 Asian Games
Asian Games medalists in bowling
Filipino ten-pin bowling players
Asian Games gold medalists for the Philippines
Asian Games bronze medalists for the Philippines
Medalists at the 1986 Asian Games
Competitors at the 1989 World Games
World Games silver medalists
World Games medalists in bowling
Filipino expatriates in the United States
1962 births
Philippine Sports Hall of Fame inductees
Southeast Asian Games medalists in bowling
Southeast Asian Games gold medalists for the Philippines
Southeast Asian Games competitors for the Philippines
Southeast Asian Games silver medalists for the Philippines
Southeast Asian Games bronze medalists for the Philippines